The Palmerston Forts around Chatham, Kent include:

Fort Amherst, technically a Napoleonic era fort but later extended.
Fort Borstal, in the village that gave its name to the youth offender's institution The Borstal.
Fort Bridgewood
Cliffe Fort
Fort Darland
Fort Darnet
Fort Pitt, a Napoleonic era fort, but used as the Army Medical School from 1860 to 1863.
Garrison Point Fort
Grain Battery
Grain Fort
Grain Tower
Grange Redoubt
Fort Hoo
Fort Horsted
Fort Luton
New Tavern Fort
Shornemead Fort
Slough Fort
Twydall Redoubts, that includes Grange and Woodlands.
Woodlands Redoubt

References

External links
Victorian Forts map of Chatham forts

Chatham